Dassault Aviation SA is a French manufacturer of military aircraft and business jets. It was founded in 1929 by Marcel Bloch as Société des Avions Marcel Bloch or "MB". After World War II, Marcel Bloch changed his name to Marcel Dassault, and the name of the company was changed to Avions Marcel Dassault on 20 January 1947.

In 1971 Dassault acquired Breguet, forming Avions Marcel Dassault-Breguet Aviation (AMD-BA). In 1990 the company was renamed Dassault Aviation, and is a subsidiary of Dassault Group.

The Dassault Aviation Group has been headed by Éric Trappier since 9 January 2013.

History

The Société des Avions Marcel Bloch was founded by Marcel Bloch in 1929. In 1935 Bloch and Henry Potez entered into an agreement to buy Société Aérienne Bordelaise (SAB), subsequently renamed Société Aéronautique du Sud-Ouest. In 1936 the arms industry in France was nationalised as the Société Nationale de Constructions Aéronautiques du Sud Ouest (SNCASO). Marcel Bloch was asked to act as delegated administrator of the Minister for Air. During the occupation of France by Nazi Germany the country's aviation industry was virtually disbanded. Marcel Bloch was imprisoned by the Vichy government in October 1940. In 1944 Bloch was deported to the Buchenwald concentration camp by the German occupiers where he remained until it was liberated on 11 April 1945.

On 10 November 1945, at an extraordinary general meeting of the Société Anonyme des Avions Marcel Bloch the company voted to change its form to a limited liability entity, Société des Avions Marcel Bloch, which was to be a holding company. On 20 January 1947 Société des Avions Marcel Bloch became Société des Avions Marcel Dassault to reflect the name adopted by its owner.

In 1954, Dassault established an electronics division (by 1962 named Electronique Marcel Dassault), the first action of which was to begin development of airborne radars, soon followed by seeker heads for air-to-air missiles, navigation, and bombing aids. From the 1950s to late 1970s exports become a major part of Dassault's business, major successes were the Dassault Mirage series and the Mystere-Falcon.

In 1965 and 1966, the French government stressed to its various defense suppliers the need to specialize to maintain viable companies. Dassault was to specialise in combat and business aircraft, Nord Aviation in ballistic missiles and Sud Aviation civil and military transport aircraft and helicopters. (Nord Aviation and Sud Aviation would merge in 1970 to form Aérospatiale which would itself later merge with 2 other firms and become EADS (now Airbus)).

On 27 June 1967, Dassault (at the urging of the French government) acquired 66% of Breguet Aviation. Under the merger deal Société des Avions Marcel Dassault was dissolved on 14 December 1971, with its assets vested in Breguet, to be renamed Avions Marcel Dassault-Breguet Aviation (AMD-BA).

Dassault Systèmes was established in 1981 to develop and market Dassault's CAD program, CATIA. Dassault Systèmes was to become a market leader in this field.

In 1979 the French government took a 20% share in Dassault and established the Societé de Gestion de Participations Aéronautiques (SOGEPA) to manage this and an indirect 25% share in Aerospatiale (the government also held a direct 75% share in that company). In 1998 the French government transferred its shares in Dassault Aviation (45.76%) to Aerospatiale. On 10 July 2000, Aérospatiale-Matra merged with other European companies to form EADS (presently Airbus).

In 2000 Serge Dassault resigned as chairman and was succeeded by Charles Edelstenne. Serge Dassault was appointed honorary chairman.

The American company Atlantic Aviation based in Wilmington, Delaware, was acquired in October 2000.

Airbus sold some of its ownership back to Dassault in 2014, and further reduced its share to 27% in 2015 then to 10% in 2016.

Subsidiaries
Sogitec, a wholly owned subsidiary of Dassault, makes advanced avionics simulation, 3D imaging, military flight simulators, and document imaging systems.

Products

Military

 Breguet family See main article: Dassault Breguet
 MD 315 Flamant, 1947
 MD 450 Ouragan, 1951
 Mystère, 1951
 MD 452 Mystère I, II, 1951
 MD 453 Mystère III, 1951 (a one-off MD-452 nightfighter)
 MD 454 Mystère IV, 1952
 Super Mystère, 1955
 MMD 550 Mystère-Delta, 1954 prototype
 Étendard, 1956
 Étendard II, 1956
 Étendard IV, 1958
 Super Étendard, 1974
 Cavalier MD 610 – VSTOL concept, 1959
 Mirage III, 1956
 Mirage IV (strategic bomber), 1959
 MD 410 Spirale, 1960
 Balzac V, 1962 VSTOL
 Mirage IIIV, (1965–1966)
 Atlantique (ATL 1, originally a Breguet product), 1965
 Mirage F2, 1966 (Prototype)
 Mirage F1, 1966
 Mirage 5, 1967
 Mirage G, 1967
 Mirage G, 1967
 Mirage G-4/G-8, 1971
 Milan, 1968
 MD 320 Hirondelle, 1968 (light military utility aircraft, only 1 prototype was built)
 Dassault/Dornier Alpha Jet (Joint venture with Dornier) 1973
 SEPECAT Jaguar (50/50 joint venture with BAC) begun within Breguet, 1973
 Falcon Guardian 1, 1977
 Mirage 2000, 1978
 Mirage 2000N/2000D 1986
 Mirage 4000, 1979 (Prototype)
 Mirage 50, 1979
 Falcon Guardian 2, 1981
 Mirage III NG, 1982
 Atlantique 2 (ATL 2), 1982
 Rafale, 1986
 nEUROn, (experimental, first flight 2012)
 New Generation Fighter (Rafale replacement)

Civilian

 Breguet family See main article: Dassault Breguet
 Falcon family
 Falcon 10 (Falcon 100 Upgraded Version)
 Falcon 20 (Falcon 200 Upgraded Version)
 Falcon 30
 Falcon 50
 Falcon 900
 Falcon 2000
 Falcon 6X
 Falcon 7X (originally Falcon FNX)
 Falcon 8X
 Falcon 10X (in development)
 Mercure – The only commercial airliner that ever flew made directly by Dassault Aviation. Designed to compete with Boeing 737. Only 12 units ever built.
 Communauté – Only 1 prototype was built.
 Mystere 30 – 30/40 passenger regional jet not brought into production.

Facilities and offices

Production

 St. Cloud – c. 1938 former engine and fighter plant now heavy-duty simulation systems, and technical branch headquarters t
 Argenteuil - c. 1952
 Biarritz – acquired Breguet plant 1971
 Merignac - c. 1947
 Talence - operating from 1939 to 1947
 Lorraine – c. 1951 as rented facility before moved to Argenteuil
 Dassault Reliance Aerospace Limited (DRAL, joint venture with Reliance Aerostructure Limited) MIHAN, Nagpur, Maharashtra, India

Service Facilities
 United States, France, China, Brazil

Sales Offices
 China, Greece, Malaysia, Oman, Russia, Taiwan

DAS Network
 Paraguay and United States

See also

 Dassault Group
 Dassault Falcon
 Dassault Rafale
 Mirage 2000
 nEUROn

References

 Dassault Aviation History, 1916 to this day. Accessed 5 Jan. 2006.

External links

 

Dassault Group
Aerospace companies of France
Aircraft manufacturers of France
Defence companies of France
Vehicle manufacturing companies established in 1930
Dassault family
French companies established in 1930
Companies listed on Euronext Paris
Multinational companies headquartered in France
 
Marcel Dassault